Port of Semayang is a seaport located in Balikpapan, East Kalimantan, Indonesia. The port is the largest and busiest port in East Kalimantan. The port serves as a transport hub between East Kalimantan and other eastern Indonesian regions such as Sulawesi and East Nusa Tenggara.

References

Balikpapan
S